This is a list of butterflies of Azerbaijan. About 230 species are known from Azerbaijan.

Hesperiidae

Pyrginae
Carcharodus alceae
Carcharodus floccifera
Carcharodus lavatherae
Carcharodus orientalis
Carcharodus stauderi
Erynnis marloyi
Erynnis tages unicolor
Muschampia poggei
Muschampia tersa
Muschampia tessellum
Pyrgus alveus
Pyrgus armoricanus
Pyrgus carthami
Pyrgus cinarae
Pyrgus cirsii
Pyrgus jupei
Pyrgus melotis
Pyrgus serratulae major
Pyrgus sidae
Spialia orbifer
Spialia phlomidis

Hesperiinae
Eogenes alcides
Gegenes nostrodamus
Hesperia comma comma
Ochlodes sylvanus
Thymelicus acteon
Thymelicus hyrax
Thymelicus lineola
Thymelicus sylvestris syriaca

Papilionidae

Parnassiinae
Parnassius mnemosyne nubilosus
Parnassius apollo tkatshukovi

Papilioninae
Iphiclides podalirius persica
Papilio machaon syriacus
Papilio alexanor orientalis

Pieridae

Dismorphiinae
Leptidea sinapis
Leptidea juvernica
Leptidea duponcheli maiae

Coliadinae
Colias alfacariensis
Colias chlorocoma
Colias aurorina
Colias thisoa
Colias croceus
Gonepteryx rhamni miljanowskii
Gonepteryx farinosa turcirana

Pierinae
Anthocharis cardamines
Anthocharis carolinae
Anthocharis damone eunomia
Anthocharis gruneri armeniaca
Aporia crataegi
Euchloe ausonia taurica
Pieris bowdeni
Pieris brassicae
Pieris caucasica
Pieris ergane detersa
Pieris krueperi krueperi
Pieris napi pseudorapae
Pieris napi suffusa
Pieris rapae transcaucasica
Pontia callidice chrysidice
Pontia chloridice
Pontia edusa edusa
Zegris eupheme menestho

Lycaenidae

Lycaeninae
Lycaena phlaeas
Lycaena virgaureae armeniaca
Lycaena tityrus
Lycaena alciphron melibeus
Lycaena candens
Lycaena thersamon
Lycaena kurdistanica
Lycaena ochimus
Lycaena asabinus
Lycaena thetis
Lycaena phoenicura

Polyommatinae
Agriades pyrenaicus dardanus
Aricia agestis azerbaidzhana
Aricia anteros
Aricia artaxerxes allous
Aricia crassipuncta
Aricia isaurica latimargo
Celastrina argiolus
Cupido argiades
Cupido minimus
Cupido osiris
Cupido staudingeri
Cyaniris bellis antiochena
Eumedonia eumedon
Freyeria trochylus
Glaucopsyche alexis lugens
Iolana iolas lessei
Kretania alcedo
Kretania eurypilus
Kretania sephirus
Kretania zephyrinus ordubadi
Lampides boeticus
Leptotes pirithous
Lysandra bellargus
Lysandra corydonius caucasica
Neolysandra coelestina coelestina
Neolysandra diana
Phengaris arion zara
Phengaris nausithous
Phengaris rebeli monticola
Plebejidea loewii
Plebejus argus bellus
Plebejus christophi transcaucasicus
Plebejus idas altarmenus
Polyommatus alcestis
Polyommatus alticola
Polyommatus altivagans
Polyommatus amandus
Polyommatus aserbeidschanus
Polyommatus cyaneus
Polyommatus damon
Polyommatus damonides
Polyommatus daphnis versicolor
Polyommatus demavendi
Polyommatus dorylas
Polyommatus eriwanensis
Polyommatus eros
Polyommatus firdussi
Polyommatus huberti
Polyommatus icarus
Polyommatus iphigenia
Polyommatus myrrha
Polyommatus neglecta
Polyommatus ninae
Polyommatus pseudorjabovi
Polyommatus ripartii
Polyommatus surakovi
Polyommatus thersites
Polyommatus turcicus
Polyommatus vanensis
Pseudophilotes vicrama schiffermuelleri
Tarucus balkanicus
Turanana endymion

Theclinae
Callophrys armeniaca
Callophrys chalybeitincta
Callophrys danchenkoi
Callophrys paulae
Callophrys rubi
Neozephyrus quercus
Satyrium abdominalis
Satyrium acaciae
Satyrium hyrcanicum
Satyrium ilicis
Satyrium ledereri
Satyrium spini melantho
Satyrium w-album
Tomares callimachus
Tomares romanovi

Nymphalidae

Libytheinae
Libythea celtis

Heliconiinae
Argynnis paphia
Argynnis pandora
Brenthis hecate
Brenthis daphne
Brenthis ino
Boloria euphrosyne dagestanica
Boloria dia
Boloria caucasica
Fabriciana adippe taurica
Fabriciana niobe gigantea
Issoria lathonia
Speyeria aglaja ottomana

Nymphalinae
Aglais io
Aglais urticae turcica
Euphydryas aurinia
Melitaea arduinna kocaki
Melitaea athalia athalia
Melitaea aurelia
Melitaea caucasogenita
Melitaea cinxia
Melitaea diamina
Melitaea didyma
Melitaea interrupta
Melitaea persea
Melitaea phoebe ottonis
Melitaea telona
Melitaea trivia caucasi
Melitaea turkmenica
Nymphalis antiopa
Nymphalis polychloros
Nymphalis xanthomelas
Polygonia c-album
Polygonia egea
Vanessa atalanta
Vanessa cardui

Limenitinae
Limenitis camilla
Limenitis reducta reducta
Neptis rivularis ludmilla

Apaturinae
Thaleropis ionia

Satyrinae
Arethusana arethusa
Brintesia circe venusta
Chazara bischoffi
Chazara briseis armena
Chazara persephone
Coenonympha arcania
Coenonympha glycerion alta
Coenonympha leander obscura
Coenonympha lyllus
Coenonympha pamphilus marginata
Coenonympha saadi
Coenonympha symphyta
Erebia aethiops melusina
Erebia graucasica
Erebia medusa psodea
Esperarge climene
Hipparchia fatua
Hipparchia parisatis
Hipparchia pellucida
Hipparchia statilinus
Hipparchia syriaca
Hyponephele lupinus
Hyponephele lycaon
Hyponephele lycaonoides
Hyponephele naricoides
Lasiommata maera orientalis
Lasiommata megera megerina
Maniola jurtina strandiana
Melanargia galathea satnia
Melanargia larissa astanda
Melanargia russiae
Minois dryas
Pararge aegeria tircis
Proterebia afra hyrcana
Pseudochazara beroe rhena
Pseudochazara daghestana
Pseudochazara geyeri
Pseudochazara pelopea
Pseudochazara schahrudensis
Pseudochazara thelephassa
Satyrus amasinus
Satyrus effendi

References

Azerbaijan
Azerbaijan
Fauna of Azerbaijan
Butterflies